The Adventist Development and Relief Agency International (ADRA or ADRA International) is a humanitarian agency operated by the Seventh-day Adventist Church for the purpose of providing individual and community development and disaster relief. It was founded in 1956, and it is headquartered in Silver Spring, Maryland, United States of America.

In 2004, ADRA reported assisting nearly 24 million people with more than US$159 million in aid. Its staff numbered over 4,000 members. As of the end of 2007, it had operations in 125 countries. According to Forbes, in 2005, ADRA ranked among America's 200 largest charities.

Mission
The organization's mission statement is: "ADRA works with people in poverty and distress to create just and positive change through empowering partnerships and responsible actions." Its stated reason for existence is "to follow Christ's example by being a voice for, serving, and partnering with those in need", and the 1983 organizational documents include a biblical rationale for conducting humanitarian work.

Purpose

ADRA partners with communities, organizations, and governments in order to develop: 
Food Security
Economic Development
Primary Health
Emergency Management
Basic Education

ADRA says that it serves people without discriminating against their ethnic, political, or religious association. Priority is given to those with disabilities, children, and senior citizens.

ADRA's areas of expertise include: Education, Emergencies, Food/nutrition, HIV/AIDS, Health, Refugees and IDPs, Shelter, Training and development, Water and sanitation, Women, Children, Monitoring and Evaluation, Programme management, and Security.

A Los Angeles Times story from 1998 reports on ADRA's 1996 10-year strategic plan, which calls the agency "a bona fide ministry of Jesus Christ and the Seventh-day Adventist Church" and "provides a strategy to reach people previously untouched by other church institutions. The church's mission is incomplete without ADRA's distinctive ministry." Much has been said about faith-based agencies taking US government funding and using those funds to further religious doctrinal missions, however, ADRA does not proselytise. It claims to operate "by love with no strings attached". As a global organisation, ADRA is a signatory of the Code of Conduct for the International Red Cross and Red Crescent Movement and NGOs in Disaster Relief, which states that "aid will not be used to further a particular political or religious standpoint", that "aid is given regardless of the race, creed, or nationality", and that organizations "shall respect culture and custom."

History
ADRA was established as the Seventh-day Adventist Welfare Service (SAWS) in November 1956. The name was changed to Seventh-day Adventist World Service in 1973.

In 1983, the organisation was renamed the 'Adventist Development and Relief Agency' to better reflect its missions and activities.

International Development Degree Program

In 1996 ADRA and Andrews University established the ADRA Professional Leadership Institute (APLI). The institute provided field-based training and continuing professional education to ADRA staff around the world. By the year 2000, the APLI program was used as a model by the Food Aid Management members as an example of "best practices for local capacity building." The model was well received by Africare, World Vision, and others. By 2003, the ADRA and Andrews University partnership offered a master's degree in International Development. More than 160 students had graduated. Sixty of those graduates had moved into management positions across the network. Seventh-day Adventist institutions of higher education on four continents offered degrees in International Development.

United Nations

The United Nations Economic and Social Council (ECOSOC) granted ADRA general Consultative Status in 1997.

Emergency response

, ADRA International had responded to approximately 60 emergencies worldwide, by which more than 127,000 people have directly benefited.

See also 

 Seventh-day Adventist Church
List of Seventh-day Adventist hospitals
List of Seventh-day Adventist medical schools
List of Seventh-day Adventist secondary schools
List of Seventh-day Adventist colleges and universities
 Seventh-day Adventist interfaith relations – for relations with other Protestants and Catholics

External links

 USA EIN 52–1314847 at Charity-Navigator
 ADRA Mauritanie

References

Charities based in Maryland
Christianity in Silver Spring, Maryland
Development charities based in the United States
Humanitarian aid organizations
Christian organizations established in 1956
International charities
Christian relief organizations
General Conference of Seventh-day Adventists
Religious charities based in the United States
Christian charities based in the United States
Seventh-day Adventist organizations